The Iluka Nature Reserve in a protected nature reserve that is located in the Northern Rivers region of New South Wales, Australia. The average elevation of the terrain above sea level is 6 meters.

The littoral rainforest, one of the last remaining in the Southern Hemisphere, is part of the Coastal group of the UNESCO World Heritagelisted Gondwana Rainforests, inscribed in 1986. The reserve was added to the Australian National Heritage List in 2007. It contains many different plant species ranging from coastal dune species to tropical rainforest species. The Iluka rainforest has a vast range of native animal species ranging from wallabies and kangaroos to wombats and echidnas. Iluka is known for the rare coastal emu.

This nature reserve is very popular with bird watchers. Over 140 species of birds have been recorded here.

See also

 Broadwater National Park
 Bundjalung National Park
 Protected areas of New South Wales

References

External links

Nature reserves in New South Wales
Gondwana Rainforests of Australia
Forests of New South Wales
Northern Rivers
1976 establishments in Australia
Protected areas established in 1976